Loimanns is a village and a cadastral municipality of Litschau, a town in the district of Gmünd in Lower Austria, Austria.

Housing Development 
At the turn of 1979/1980 there was a total of 95 building plots with 32.143 m² and 48 gardens with 8.753 m², 1989/1990 there were 120 buildings plots. At the turn of 1999/2000, the number of buildings plots had increased to 341 and at the turn of 2009/2010 there were 148 buildings on 327 building plots.

References 

Cities and towns in Lower Austria
Cadastral community of Austria